Kaun Jeetega Bollywood Ka Ticket is an Indian television reality show that aired on 9X from 20 July 2008 to 17 November 2008. The winners of the series were TV actors Naman Shaw and partner Bindu.

Mentors 
 Zeenat Aman
 Shabana Azmi
 Amrita Singh
 Mahesh Manjrekar

Contestants 
The following is the list of celebrity contestants of the series.

 Kratika Sengar
 Naman Shaw
 Jay Bhanushali
 Dimple Jhangiani
 Chetan Hansraj
 Panchi Bora
 Reshmi Ghosh
 Twinkle Bajpai
 Akashdeep Saigal
 Abigail Jain
 Karan Patel
 Karishma Tanna
 Raj Singh Arora
 Vikas Manaktala
 Mihika Verma
 Mayank Gandhi
 Sanyogita Maheshwari Mayor
 Karan Wahi
 Drashti Dhami
 Archana Taide

References

External links
 
 Official site on Balaji Telefilms

Balaji Telefilms television series
Indian reality television series
9X (TV channel) original programming
2008 Indian television series debuts
2008 Indian television series endings